Charles Boone may refer to:
 Charles Boone (governor) (died 1735), British governor of the Bombay Presidency, 1715–1722
 Charles Boone (composer) (born 1939), American composer
 Pat Boone (Charles Eugene Boone, born 1934), American singer, actor and writer
 Charles Boone (1652–1689), British Member of Parliament for Dartmouth
 Charles Boone (died 1735), British Member of Parliament for Ludgershall
 Charles Boone (died 1819) (1729–1819), British Member of Parliament for Castle Rising and Ashburton
 Lefty Boone (Charles Pernell Boone, born 1920), American baseball player